"Country Club Republican" also known as a "Country Club Conservative" or "Establishment Republican" is an expression employed, usually pejoratively, to describe certain members of the Republican Party in the United States.  Some of the characteristics attributed to country club Republicans are higher than average income or inherited wealth, hailing from politically or socially prominent families, fiscally conservative opinions but with liberal, moderate or indifferent views on social issues such as abortion, censorship, and gay rights. They are more likely to have attended prestigious colleges and universities than other Republican Party members.

Politicians said to be country club Republicans include: President George H. W. Bush, former Secretary of State James Baker, former Secretary of State Rex Tillerson, former Secretary of State Colin Powell, Utah Senator Mitt Romney, former governor of New Jersey Thomas Kean, and former Texas Senator Kay Bailey Hutchison.

Current officeholders 

Senators
Mitt Romney, Senator from Utah
Shelley Moore Capito, Senator from West Virginia
Susan Collins, Senator from Maine
Bill Cassidy, Senator from Louisiana 

Representatives
Brian Fitzpatrick, Congressman from Pennsylvania
David Valadao, Congressman from California
Mike Lawler, Congressman from New York

Governors
Jim Justice, Governor of West Virginia
Chris Sununu, Governor of New Hampshire
Brian Kemp, Governor of Georgia
Spencer Cox, Governor of Utah

Former office holders 

Presidents
George H. W. Bush, Former President of the United States (1989–1993), 43rd Vice President of the United States (1981–1989), Former CIA director (1976–1977), Ambassador to China (1974–1975), Chair of the Republican National Committee (1973–1974), Ambassador to the U.N (1971–1973), Former Representative from Texas's 7th District (1967–1971)
George W. Bush, Former President of the United States (2001–2009), 46th Governor of Texas (1995–2000)

Senators
 Prescott Bush, Senator from Connecticut
 John Chafee, Senator from Rhode Island
 Barry Goldwater, Senator from Arizona
 John Heinz, Senator from Pennsylvania
 Kay Bailey Hutchison, Senator from Texas
 Henry Cabot Lodge, Jr., Senator from Massachusetts
 Kelly Loeffler, Senator from Georgia
 John McCain, Senator from Arizona
 David Perdue, Senator from Georgia
 John Warner, Senator from Virginia
 Richard Burr, Senator from North Carolina
 Pat Toomey, Senator from Pennsylvania
 Rob Portman, Senator from Ohio

Representatives
 Judy Biggert, Representative from Illinois
 Phil Crane, Representative from Illinois
 Bob Dold, Representative from Illinois
 Millicent Fenwick, Representative from New Jersey
 Amo Houghton, Representative from New York
 Liz Cheney, Congresswoman from Wyoming
 Peter Meijer, Congressman from Michigan

Governors
Jeb Bush, Governor of Florida
Pete du Pont, Governor of Delaware
Bill Haslam, Governor of Tennessee
Thomas Kean, Governor of New Jersey
Bruce Rauner, Governor of Illinois
Nelson Rockefeller, Governor of New York
Bob Taft, Governor of Ohio
Bill Weld, Governor of Massachusetts
Pete Wilson, Governor of California
John Kasich, Governor of Ohio
Charlie Baker, Governor of Massachusetts

Others 

Steve Forbes, editor-in-chief of Forbes, candidate for Republican presidential nomination in 1996 and 2000

See also
Republican In Name Only (RINO)
Rockefeller Republican

References

Republican Party (United States) terminology